The 2014–15 season Córdoba CF season was the club's 60th season in its history and ninth participating in La Liga, the top-flight of Spanish football.

Squad

Out on loan

As 2014..

Transfers

Statistics

Appearances and goals
Updated as of 30 May 2015.

|-
! colspan=10 style=background:#dcdcdc; text-align:center| Players who have made an appearance or had a squad number this season but have been loaned out or transferred

|}

Competitions

Overall

La Liga

Legend

Results by round

Matches
Kickoff times are in CEST and CET.

League table

Copa del Rey

Round of 32

References

Córdoba CF seasons
Cordoba CF